Manitoba Municipal Relations (formerly Department of Municipal Affairs, until 1978) is a department of the Government of Manitoba that deals with local administrations and bodies, including municipalities, planning districts, and non-governmental organizations. This includes the provision of training, ongoing consultation, technical analysis, and funding related to land management, community renewal, infrastructure, and the building of capacity of local governments to provide services.

The department is organized into two functional areas: Community Planning and Development; and Infrastructure and Municipal Services. There are also two areas of special focus:

 The Manitoba Water Services Board is a Crown Corporation of the department that helps deliver technical advice/information in order to develop and upgrade sewer and water infrastructure
 The Office of the Fire Commissioner is a special operating agency of the department, with a mandate to "safeguard both persons and property from fire and life safety hazards through education, investigations, inspections, emergency response and code application."

History 
From 1886 to 1953, responsibility for overseeing municipal affairs throughout the province of Manitoba belong to the Department of the Municipal Commissioner, which was established by The Manitoba Municipal Act. The Municipal Commissioner replaced the existing system of municipal councils, county councils, and judicial boards which was established in the 1870s. This system was maintained by municipal taxation, and was soon found to be too costly and difficult to manage. County councils were abolished in 1884, followed by the judicial boards two years later; the Department of Municipal Commissioner was created thereafter.

In 1953, the office of Municipal Commissioner was restructured and the provincial government assumed new responsibilities for municipal supervision. The result was the creation of the Department of Municipal Affairs by The Department of Municipal Affairs Act on 20 April 1953.

From around 1966 to 1969, the department was known as the Department of Urban Development and Municipal Affairs. However, in 1971, the enactment of the new City of Winnipeg Act saw the creation a new Department of Urban Affairs, which was responsible for advising and assisting the new City of Winnipeg. The Department of Municipal Affairs continued to advise and assist rural municipalities in Manitoba.

In 1978, the Municipal Affairs and Urban Affairs departments briefly merged to create the Department of Municipal and Urban Affairs. In 1979, a Minister of Urban Affairs was appointed but the departments did not formally separate again until 1981.

In 1989, under the government of Gary Filmon, Municipal Affairs was combined with parts of the Department of Industry, Trade and Tourism, the Department of Agriculture, and the Department of Natural Resources to form the Department of Rural Development. It provided advisory and program services to municipalities, local economic and environmental organizations, and citizens in rural Manitoba. In 1992, the Department was organized into two divisions—Local Government Services and Rural Economic Development—which oversaw branches and programs including the Food Development Centre, Rural Development Institute, Conservation Districts Program, and Assessment Branch.

In 1999, Rural Development merged with the Department of Urban Affairs to create the Department of Intergovernmental Affairs. All of the programs of the former Department of Rural Development were absorbed into the new department, except for the Food Development Centre, which became part of the Department of Agriculture and Food.

In 2003, the Department's Rural and Northern Community Economic Development division was transferred to the newly-created Manitoba Agriculture, Food and Rural Initiatives (MAFRI) department. At the same time, the Trade and Federal-Provincial and International Relations division was created in the department through programming transfers from five departments; as result, the department was renamed the Department of Intergovernmental Affairs and Trade. In September 2006, the Trade and Federal-Provincial and International Relations division, the Canada-Manitoba Infrastructure Agreement and the Economic Partnership Agreement were transferred out of the department and it was again renamed the Department of Intergovernmental Affairs.

In November 2009, the various divisions were transferred out of the Department of Intergovernmental Affairs and it was subsequently renamed the Department of Local Government. In October 2013, a government reorganization added the Energy Division, along with responsibilities for Manitoba Hydro, to the department which was then renamed the Department of Municipal Government. A new position of Minister Responsible for Relations with the City of Winnipeg was created under this new department.

On 3 May 2016, the responsibilities of the former departments of Municipal Government and Aboriginal and Northern Affairs were combined into a single unit, the department of Indigenous and Municipal Relations, created by the newly-elected government led by Brian Pallister. The following year, the portfolios were again split, establishing the departments of Municipal Relations and Indigenous and Northern Relations.

List of Municipal Relations ministers 

The longest-serving Minister of Municipal Affairs in Manitoba was Howard Pawley, who served from 1969 to 1976 and played a significant role in the amalgamation of Winnipeg.  Pawley later served as Premier of Manitoba from 1981 to 1988.

Statutory responsibilities 

 The Buildings and Mobile Homes Act
 City of Winnipeg Charter (S.M. 2002, c. 39)
 The Capital Region Partnership Act
 The Community Renewal Act
 The Convention Centre Corporation Act (S.M. 1988-89, c. 39)
 The Electricians' Licence Act
 The Elevator Act
 The Fires Prevention and Emergency Response Act
 The Gas and Oil Burner Act
 The Local Government Districts Act
 The Municipal Act
 The Municipal Assessment Act
 The Municipal Affairs Administration Act
 The Municipal Amalgamations Act
 The Municipal Board Act
 The Municipal Councils and School Boards Elections Act
 An Act respecting Debts Owing by Municipalities to School Districts
 The Official Time Act
 The Planning Act [except Part 10]
 The Power Engineers Act
 The Regional Waste Management Authorities Act
 The Soldiers' Taxation Relief Act 
 The Steam and Pressure Plants Act
 The Technical Safety Act
 The Unconditional Grants Act
 The Manitoba Water Services Board Act
 The Bilingual Service Centres Act, C.C.S.M. c. B37
 The Francophone Community Enhancement and Support Act, C.C.S.M. c. F157
 The Department of Agriculture, Food and Rural Development Act [Section 9 "insofar as it relates to Rural Opportunities 4 Growth, Infrastructure Grants or Rural Economic Development Initiatives"]
 The Amusements Act [Part II]
 The Labour Administration Act ["insofar as it relates to the administration of The Fires Prevention and Emergency Response Act"]
 The Municipal Taxation and Funding Act [Part 2]

See also 

 Ministry of Municipal Affairs (Alberta)
 Department of Municipal Affairs (New Brunswick)
 Ministry of Municipal Affairs and Housing (Ontario)
 Ministry of Municipal Affairs and Housing (Quebec)

References 
Municipal_Affairs_(Manitoba)

Manitoba, Ministry_of_Municipal_Affairs